David James "Tiger" Williams (born February 3, 1954) is a Canadian former professional ice hockey player who played in the National Hockey League (NHL) from the 1974–75 NHL season to the 1987–88 NHL season. He notably played in the 1981 NHL All-Star Game and the 1982 Stanley Cup Final. He is the NHL's career leader in penalty minutes.

NHL career
Williams was drafted in the second round (31st overall) by the Toronto Maple Leafs of the NHL in the 1974 NHL amateur draft. He was also drafted by the Cincinnati Stingers of the World Hockey Association (WHA) in the third round (33rd overall) in the 1974 WHA Amateur Draft, but he chose the NHL.

Williams was best known for his role as an enforcer, but he was also able to score goals. He played on five different NHL teams during his career. He was drafted by the Maple Leafs and played there from his NHL debut on 7 January against the New York Islanders in 1975 until he was traded to the Vancouver Canucks on 18 February, 1980 for Rick Vaive and Bill Derlago. While in Toronto, he broke many Maple Leaf and NHL penalty minute records and led the league in penalty minutes twice with 338 in 1976–77 and 298 in 1978–79. During his best season in Toronto, he scored 22 goals in 55 games before being traded to the Vancouver Canucks part way through that season. He scored 8 more goals in 23 games that season with Vancouver for, at that time, a career best 30 goals.

The next season, 1980–81, in Vancouver, Williams scored a career high of 35 goals and 62 points while amassing a league leading 343 penalty minutes in 77 games. The 343 penalty minutes would be the third highest of his career. Those 35 goals were the most by any Canuck that year. That season, Williams earned a place in the mid-season All-Star game, having scored 27 goals by the All-Star break, and played on a line with Wayne Gretzky and Mike Bossy. He would play an integral role in the team's surprise run to the Stanley Cup finals in 1982. Williams played in Vancouver until the end of the 1983–84 season.

After Vancouver, Williams played for the Detroit Red Wings for part of the 1984–85 NHL season before being traded to the Los Angeles Kings that same year. During his tenure in Los Angeles, he would set his career high of 358 penalty minutes for one season. He would play in Los Angeles until he was traded to the Hartford Whalers during the 1987–88 NHL season. That would also be his last NHL season as Hartford placed him on waivers and he was released on February 12, 1988. He officially retired in 1988.

Williams was nicknamed "Tiger" as a 5-year-old by his minor hockey coach in Weyburn, Saskatchewan. He also appeared as himself in the first episode of the Canadian sitcom Rent-a-Goalie. Bryan Trottier credits Williams with talking him out of giving up hockey as a youngster, which eventually led to a Hall of Fame career with the New York Islanders.

After the NHL

Co-written by James Lawton, Williams published his autobiography, Tiger: A Hockey Story in 1984. In 1987, Williams released a 101-page cookbook called Done Like Dinner: Tiger In the Kitchen. It was co-written with Kasey Wilson. It included many hockey-inspired recipes, including Habs Tourtière, Stanley Cup Bars, and Luc Robitaille's Lasagna Omelette.

Williams re-emerged briefly as a roller hockey player, appearing in one game, scoring two points, for the RHI's Vancouver Voodoo in 1993.

In 1996, Canadian punk rock band The Hanson Brothers spearheaded a campaign to agitate for Williams' induction into the Hockey Hall of Fame. They included a mail-in postcard with their album Sudden Death so that purchasers could make their feelings known to the NHL.

As a guest on the Tony Gallagher phone in radio program Williams claimed that then Canucks manager Pat Quinn attempted to have his Canucks #22 sweater retired by the team.  However, due to arcane rules required at the time they had to receive permission from the previous player who wore it, Bob Manno. Manno refused so the team offered him money, according to Williams. Manno still refused.  The #22 sweater was eventually worn (and later retired in honour of) from 2000 to 2018 by Canucks alternate captain and Art Ross trophy winner, Daniel Sedin.

At the 2002 NHL All-Star Game in Los Angeles, the NHL held the NHL All-Star Celebrity Challenge.  The home team all wore #22 in honour of Williams.

On February 9, 2018, Williams was charged with sexual assault while on a military trip to Latvia. These charges were withdrawn by Crown attorney Meaghan Cunningham after he issued an apology.

Records
National Hockey League records:
Most NHL career regular season penalty minutes: 3,971
Most NHL penalty minutes, career, including playoffs: 4,426
Toronto Maple Leafs records:
Most playoff penalty minutes: 240
Most penalty minutes in one season by a left wing: 351 in 1978
Vancouver Canucks records:
Most playoff penalty minutes: 181
Most penalty minutes in one playoff year: 116 in 1982
Most penalty minutes in one playoff series: 51 vs. Chicago in 1982

Career statistics 
Figures in Italics are records broken in that category

See also
List of NHL players with 2,000 career penalty minutes
Fighting in ice hockey
Enforcer (ice hockey)

References

External links 
 

1954 births
Living people
Adirondack Red Wings players
Canadian expatriate ice hockey players in the United States
Canadian ice hockey left wingers
Canadian people of British descent
Cincinnati Stingers draft picks
Detroit Red Wings players
Hartford Whalers players
Ice hockey people from Saskatchewan
Los Angeles Kings players
National Hockey League All-Stars
Oklahoma City Blazers (1965–1977) players
Sportspeople from Weyburn
Swift Current Broncos players
Toronto Maple Leafs draft picks
Toronto Maple Leafs players
Vancouver Canucks players
Vancouver VooDoo players
Vernon Vikings players